Big Creek Valley was a village in Carbon County, Pennsylvania, United States. It was part of Northeastern Pennsylvania.

In 1966, the village was vacated to make way for Beltzville Lake, located in what is now Beltzville State Park. American composer David W. Guion may have lived in Big Creek Valley.

References

Former populated places in Pennsylvania
Geography of Carbon County, Pennsylvania
Populated places disestablished in 1966